is a museum in Okayama, Japan. It was built to house important artifacts from the prefecture dating from prehistory through modern times.

Notable exhibits
The museum houses one National Treasure, red-laced yoroi armor from the 12th century. Although documents about red-dyed armor lacing exist, the museum's armor is the only known example of this type of armor.

The museums also houses two important tachi swords, one a National Important Cultural Property and the other an Important Cultural Property of Okayama Prefecture.

See also
 Prefectural museum

References

External links

  

Museums in Okayama Prefecture
History museums in Japan